The Maranhão gubernatorial election, 2002 was held in the Brazilian state of Maranhão on October 6, alongside Brazil's general elections. PFL candidate, José Reinaldo, was re-elected on October 6, 2002.

Candidates

References 

2002
2002 Brazilian gubernatorial elections